The 1998 United States rugby union tour of Portugal and Spain was a rugby union tour of Portugal and Spain by the United States national rugby union team during April 1998.

Results

References

United States
United States national rugby union team tours
Rugby union tour
Rugby union tour
Rugby union tours of Portugal
Rugby union tours of Spain